Yohny Romero (born 30 November 1978) is a Venezuelan former professional tennis player.

Tennis career
Romero, who was born in Caracas, represented Venezuela in the Davis Cup from 1999 to 2010, featuring in a total of 16 ties. He won eight singles and four doubles rubbers.

While competing on the professional tour, Romero reached a career high singles ranking of 262 in the world, with qualifying draw appearances at the Australian Open and Wimbledon.

Romero partnered with Maurice Ruah to win a bronze medal for Venezuela in doubles at the 1999 Pan American Games. He was a mixed doubles gold medalist at the 2006 Central American and Caribbean Games, where he also claimed a silver medal in the singles event.

Since retiring he served as team captain of Venezuela's Fed Cup team for several years, then in 2017 took over as Davis Cup captain.

References

External links
 
 
 

1978 births
Living people
Venezuelan male tennis players
Tennis players from Caracas
Pan American Games medalists in tennis
Pan American Games bronze medalists for Venezuela
Tennis players at the 1999 Pan American Games
Competitors at the 2006 Central American and Caribbean Games
Central American and Caribbean Games medalists in tennis
Central American and Caribbean Games gold medalists for Venezuela
Central American and Caribbean Games silver medalists for Venezuela
Tennis players at the 2007 Pan American Games
Medalists at the 1999 Pan American Games
20th-century Venezuelan people
21st-century Venezuelan people